All My Tears may refer to:

 All My Tears, an album by Alton Ellis
 "All My Tears", a song by Julie Miller with Emmylou Harris, also covered by Harris and separately covered by jazz vocalist Jimmy Scott and later on by Norwegian artist Ane Brun
 All My Tears is also covered by Jars of Clay on their album Good Monsters

See also 
 "All of My Tears", a song by Spiritualized, a non-album B-side from Ladies and Gentlemen We Are Floating in Space